Tithraustes seminigrata is a moth of the family Notodontidae. It is found in Panama.

Larvae have been reared on an unidentified species of palm in the genus Calyptrogyne.

References

Moths described in 1901
Notodontidae of South America